Mami Aqcheli (also Romanized as Mamī Āqchelī and Mamī Āq Chālī; also known as Mamī Zeytonlī) is a village in Nezamabad Rural District, in the Central District of Azadshahr County, Golestan Province, Iran. At the 2006 census, its population was 288, in 61 families.

References 

Populated places in Azadshahr County